Agnippe turanica is a moth of the family Gelechiidae. It is found in Uzbekistan and south-eastern Kazakhstan.

The wingspan is 9.5–10.5 mm. The forewings have a black basal patch and a broad black medial pattern. The posterior half of the forewings is white. The hindwings are light grey. Adults are on wing from late May to early June.

Etymology
The name of the species refers to the distribution in the Turanian region.

References

Moths described in 2010
Agnippe
Moths of Asia